Henry Hewson was a professional rugby league footballer who played in the 1920s.

Playing career
Hewson made his début for Wakefield Trinity during January 1921, he appears to have scored no drop-goals (or field-goals as they are currently known in Australasia), but prior to the 1974–75 season all goals, whether; conversions, penalties, or drop-goals, scored 2-points, consequently prior to this date drop-goals were often not explicitly documented, therefore '0' drop-goals may indicate drop-goals not recorded, rather than no drop-goals scored. In addition, prior to the 1949–50 season, the archaic field-goal was also still a valid means of scoring points.

References

External links

Search for "Hewson" at rugbyleagueproject.org

English rugby league players
Year of birth missing
Year of death missing
Place of birth missing
Place of death missing
Rugby league second-rows
Wakefield Trinity players